Udea suralis is a moth in the family Crambidae. It was described by Schaus in 1933. It is found in Brazil.

References

suralis
Moths described in 1933